The 2009 Bahrain 1st GP2 Asia Series round was a GP2 Asia Series motor race held on 23 and 24 January 2009 at Bahrain International Circuit in Sakhir, Bahrain. It was the third round of the 2008–09 GP2 Asia Series.

Classification

Qualifying

Feature race

Sprint race

Standings after the event 

Drivers' Championship standings

Teams' Championship standings

 Note: Only the top five positions are included for both sets of standings.

See also 
 2009 Bahrain 1st Speedcar Series round

Notes

References

GP2 Asia Series
GP2 Asia